Peekay may refer to:

Peekay (The Power of One), main character of the novel The Power of One
Peekay (film), or PK, 2014 Indian film

See also
 PK (disambiguation)
 Pique (disambiguation)